Manoba microphasma is a moth in the family Nolidae. It was described by Arthur Gardiner Butler in 1885. It is found in Japan.

References

Arctiidae genus list at Butterflies and Moths of the World of the Natural History Museum

Moths described in 1885
Nolinae